Frederick Ronald Gómez (born 25 October 1984) is an Aruban football player. He has played for the Aruba national team.

International career
He appeared during the 2014 FIFA World Cup qualification against St. Lucia, in the first leg where he scored a victory goal in a 4-2 match, matching the result of the previous game. He also appeared in the 2018 FIFA World Cup qualification as a forward. In 2018, he netted his goal in the qualifying rounds of the CONCACAF Nations League resulting 3–1 victory against Bermuda national football team.

National team statistics
As of 5 June 2021

International goals 
Scores and results list Aruba's goal tally first.

References

External links

1984 births
Living people
Aruban footballers
People from Oranjestad, Aruba
Association football defenders
Association football forwards
SV Racing Club Aruba players
Aruban Division di Honor players
Aruba international footballers